Marina Khalturina (born June 17, 1974 in Sverdlovsk, Sverdlovsk Oblast) is a figure skater who represented Kazakhstan in international competition as a pair skater and a single skater. She competed internationally as a pair skater from 1992 through 2000, first with Andrei Krukov and then with Valeriy Artyukhov. With Krukov, she placed 14th at the 1998 Winter Olympics. With Artyuchov, she competed at both the Four Continents Championships and World Figure Skating Championships. She went back to single skating in 2001. During her career, she was coached by Juri Litvinov, Sergei Korovin, and Roman Skorniakov.

Results

Singles

Pairs

With Krukov

With Artyuchov

References

External links 
 

Kazakhstani female single skaters
Kazakhstani female pair skaters
1974 births
Olympic figure skaters of Kazakhstan
Figure skaters at the 1998 Winter Olympics
Living people
Asian Games medalists in figure skating
Figure skaters at the 1996 Asian Winter Games
Figure skaters at the 1999 Asian Winter Games
Asian Games silver medalists for Kazakhstan
Medalists at the 1996 Asian Winter Games
Medalists at the 1999 Asian Winter Games
Universiade medalists in figure skating
Universiade gold medalists for Kazakhstan
Competitors at the 1995 Winter Universiade
Competitors at the 1997 Winter Universiade